Sir Edward Dolman Scott, 2nd Baronet (22 October 1793 – 27 December 1852) was an English landowner and a Whig politician.

He succeeded to the Baronetcy of Scott of Great Barr and inherited the estate at Great Barr Hall on the death of his father in 1828.

He was Member of Parliament for Lichfield 1831–1837. He was High Sheriff of Staffordshire in 1847. He was also Deputy Lieutenant of Staffordshire and Sussex.

He married twice, firstly  in 1815 to Catherine Juliana Bateman by whom he had three sons, and secondly in 1848 to Lydia Gisborne. He was succeeded by his son Francis Edward, who had, at birth in 1824, succeeded to the Baronetcy of Bateman of Hartington (see Bateman baronets).

References

 The Baronetage of England John Debrett (1839) p 327

External links 
 

1793 births
1852 deaths
Baronets in the Baronetage of the United Kingdom
Deputy Lieutenants of Staffordshire
Deputy Lieutenants of Sussex
High Sheriffs of Staffordshire
Members of the Parliament of the United Kingdom for English constituencies
UK MPs 1831–1832
UK MPs 1832–1835
UK MPs 1835–1837
Whig (British political party) MPs
English landowners
Great Barr
19th-century British businesspeople